Mihailo "Miljko" Radonjić (1770 – 1836) was a Serbian writer, professor at the Belgrade's Grandes écoles and politician-diplomat. Not much is known about him. He was an educated man. During the Serbian Revolution (1804–1813) he was part of the Serbian rebel government, and served as the Minister of Foreign Affairs as part of the Cabinet of Karađorđe Petrović (1811–12). He taught German at Belgrade's Grandes écoles (est. 1808).

After the collapse of the uprising in 1813, he went to Trieste where he lived and worked until 1823 as a teacher at the Jovan Militić School in Trieste. After Trieste, he went to Wallachia (today's Romania) where he engaged in trade. Radonjić was the first Foreign Minister in the modern history of Serbian statehood. He was appointed to that position when the previously appointed Milenko Stojković (from January 11, 1811) refused to enter the Governing State Council and accept the duty of minister.

See also
Serbs in Italy

References

Sources

19th-century Serbian people
Serbian politicians
Serbian writers
Serbian educators
People of the Serbian Revolution
Belgrade Higher School people
1770 births
1836 deaths
Foreign ministers of Serbia